McKay Lake is a lake in Lake Superior drainage basin in the east part of Thunder Bay District in northwestern Ontario, Canada and the source of the Pic River.

The primary inflows are (counterclockwise from the Pic River outflow): the Pout River at the southeast; an unnamed creek from Little McKay Lake at Yankee Bay at the north; and Sandlink Creek at Northeast Bay at the northeast. The primary outflow is the Pic River at Outlet Bay at the southeast tip of the lake, controlled by the McKay Lake Dam.

Big Island in the centre of the lake is surrounded by the North, Morrin, South and West Channels. Other named bays include Boot Bay and Portage Bay at the southwest and Reedy Bay at the east.

References

Lakes of Thunder Bay District